In quantum information theory, the Lieb conjecture is a theorem concerning the Wehrl entropy of quantum systems for which the classical phase space is a sphere.  It states that no state of such a system has a lower Wehrl entropy than the SU(2) coherent states.

The analogous property for quantum systems for which the classical phase space is a plane was conjectured by Alfred Wehrl in 1978 and proven soon afterwards by Elliott H. Lieb, who at the same time extended it to the SU(2) case.  The conjecture was only proven in 2012, by Lieb and Jan Philip Solovej.

References

External links
 Video of a lecture by Lieb discussing the conjecture and outlining its proof.

Quantum mechanical entropy
Conjectures that have been proved